The Bisbee Historic District is located in Bisbee, Arizona, and has all the essential features of a prosperous, early twentieth century mining town.

History
The Historic District's history is tied with that of the Phelps Dodge Company, one of the great industrial corporations of the 20th century.  Once the company began operations in the Bisbee area, it dominated the town's economy, as well as the town's physical and social development.  The District mirrors this fact, being an example of an early twentieth-century mining company town.  Prior to the arrival of Phelps Dodge, the area was a hub for mining activity.  Rich veins of ore were discovered by the U. S. Army in the nearby Mule Mountains in 1877, with the Copper Queen Mine being founded that year.  The following year the town saw its first smelter, and financial capitalists from both the east and west coast began to invest heavily in the area.  The mining camp developed into a town by 1880, and was named Bisbee, after Judge DeWitt Bisbee, who was a heavy investor in the area.  While the town was still small, the mining activity in it and nearby Tombstone, Arizona, focused most of the territory's population into these remote areas.  The formation of Cochise County soon followed in 1881, with Tombstone as the county seat.  In 1881, James Douglas of the Phelps Dodge Company convinced his company to purchase the claims adjoining the Copper Queen Mine.  The began operations, with Douglas in charge of the site.  It was the beginning of a highly successful mining operation, which resulted in over $2 billion worth of ore being produced in the area around Bisbee, the majority of it in properties owned by Phelps Dodge.

One of the largest issues with the location was transportation.  Supplies had to be brought in by wagon, and ore and to be sent the same way to the nearest railhead in Benson.  Production increased, and in 1886, new, larger smelters were built, and eventually rose to over 100 tons of freight per day.  The Southern Pacific railway refused to build a line from Bisbee to Benson, so in 1894 Phelps Dodge built its own rail line to Benson.  By 1900 the new smelters could no longer keep up with production, but lack of water prevented larger ones from being built in Bisbee, so a new smelter town sprang up near the Mexico-United States Border, Douglas, named so after James Douglas.

As the copper industry went, so went Bisbee.  In 1881, the town had a population of 300, most of whom lived in tents.  By 1884 the population had risen to 500, and the first wood and adobe structures began to be constructed, replacing the tents.  In the next six years the town began to expand rapidly, and had a population of 1500 in 1890.  Brick buildings began to appear on Main Street.  Frame cottages began to be constructed on the hillsides around the city.  More affluent areas developed around Quality Hill and Higgins Hill.  Brewery Gulch became congested as the center of activity for the miners.  The street had businesses packed side by side along the street, including saloons, shops, and lodging houses.  Further along Brewery Gulch was the red light district.  1902 saw the incorporation of the town, and the three main streets Main, Howell, and Brewery, were paved with bricks. The population had exploded to 10,000 by 1904, and electric lights and gas were added to the town the same year.  Streetcars came to the town in 1908, and ran until 1929, when they were replaced by buses.  As the town prospered, it gained in prominence, and in 1929 the Cochise County seat was moved from Tombstone to Bisbee.  The courthouse, of art deco design, was completed in 1931.

The town's geography and location caused the town to be prone to fires and floods.  The Historic District experienced severe flooding in 1886, 1890, and 1908.  The 1890 flood saw a 20-foot wall of water sweep through the town one night.  The 1908 flood deposited several feet of mud and debris in the post office, and that same year a fire devastated the commercial area of Main Street, causing $500,000 worth of damage.  Following these disasters, the town paid for flood abatement systems to be put in place, as well as a public water system to provide for fire-fighting.

The mining industry supported the town for approximately the first 75 years of the twentieth century, although large scale development of the town ended by the end of World War I, with lower mining production.  The industry was suppressed by large wartime stockpiles, without the military market of a wartime economy.  That was exacerbated by large copper deposits being discovered in South America.  The 1920s saw the town gradually reviving, until the Great Depression set in.  As the grade of ore decreased, new methods were employed.  The Sacramento Hill was an open pit mine from 1917 through 1929, and the Lavender Pit, one of the largest open-pit copper mines in the world, was in operation from 1951 to 1974.  In 1975 the Copper Queen Mine ceased operations, and by this time the mining around Bisbee had become a small part of the operations of Phelps Dodge.  The mine closures were severe blows to the town's economy.

Description

The area is a dense combination of commercial buildings, residential houses, and institutional structures sitting side by side along several narrow streets, the two main ones being Main Street and Brewery Gulch.  These include lodging houses, governmental, educational and religious buildings.  Most of the structures were built being 1890 and 1915.  The district is an irregular wedge-shaped area, with its apex at the intersection of Main Street and Clawson Avenue.  This portion of the district contains the County Courthouse, St. Patrick's Church, and the Loretto Academy.  At the other end of the wedge, formed by O.K. Street and Brewery Gulch, sits an historic City Park and the Phelps Dodge General Office Building.  In between these perimeter streets are several major and minor streets. There is a plaza, which fronts another Phelps Dodge building, the Mercantile.  To the west of the Plaza are the entrances to Subway Alley and Main Street.  Subway Alley is home to the Copper Queen Hospital, the Fair Building and its annex.

Main street includes the Bank of Bisbee, the Copper Queen Library, the Post Office, the Anguis Building, the First Baptist Church, and the Castle Rock Hotel.  After the hotel, Main Street turns into a more residential street, with one and two story houses.  At its other end is the Courthouse.  Clawson also has numerous residential buildings, but also includes the Bisbee High School.  Howell Avenue, running between Clawson and Brewery Gulch, contains St. John's Episcopal Church, the YWCA Building, and the Copper Queen Hotel.  Mansfield is a short street, connecting with Clawson.  Opera Drive winds around the district, and contains the YMCA, the Central School, and passes to the east of the City Park.  On the western side of the Park, Brewery Gulch and O.K. Street run downhill toward Queen Avenue and Naco Road, and has a dense concentration of buildings.  One of the highlights of this section is the Pythian Castle with its clock tower.  Near the Castle are several of the lodging houses, which were built for the miners who worked in the nearby mines.

The district contains buildings over a wide swath of uses: hotels, lodging houses, social lodges, churches, schools, residences, and government buildings.  They are normally of frame, adobe, or block construction.  The larger buildings are usually constructed with brick, steel, or concrete.  Some of the architectural styles in the district include Victorian Italianate, Second Renaissance Revival, Sullivanesque, Art Deco, Streamline Modern, Neo-Classical Revival, Gothic Revival, Mission Revival, and Colonial Revival.

Architecture

The architecture of the Historic District runs parallel to the Bisbee's economic history. There is a scarcity of buildings built post-World War I, which reflects the town's lack of growth subsequent to 1920.  Most of the buildings date from 1895 to 1915, the heyday of the mining industry in Bisbee.  In other towns which continued to grow, many of these buildings would have been razed and replaced with newer, larger buildings.

Remaining historic buildings can be broken into five main categories: public and semi-public facilities; commercial structures; religious, social and education facilities; lodging houses; and residential homes.  The public/semi-public buildings were erected with full or partial support of the Phelps Dodge company and include, the Copper Queen Hospital, Copper Queen Hotel, YMCA, and the
Copper Queen Library and Post Office.  Commercial structures include the Citizens Bank and Trust, the Letson Block, the Medigovich Building II, the Muheim Block, and the Johnson Building. The religious/social/education structures include the Covenant Presbyterian Church, BPOE Building, and the Central School. Many of the buildings in these first three categories were designed by architects, the two most prominent being Henry Trost and Frederick C. Hurst.  Lodging houses and residential properties include the Castle Rock Hotel, the Billy Brophy House, and the Spencer Clawson Residence.

Contributing structures
Below is a table of the structures which contribute to the significance of the district.  They are rated either: C (contributing); S (significant); NR (has a separate individual listing on the NRHP).

External links
 Newspaper article about the district

References

National Register of Historic Places in Cochise County, Arizona
Historic districts in Arizona